Ashton windmill is a tower mill in Chapel Allerton, Somerset, England.

The first mill on the site was medieval, but the present structure probably dates from the 18th century. It was modernised in 1900 with machinery brought from the demolished Moorlinch mill, and iron hoops around the building being added. It was restored in 1967. The mill has been designated by English Heritage as a grade II* listed building.

It is now preserved, having been given to Bristol City Museum in 1966 and is owned by Sedgemoor District Council, and maintained by volunteers.

In 2008 the council applied for listed building planning consent to undertake major restoration work on the windmill, including replacement of the stone steps, installation of hand rails, guard rails and safety bars, alterations to the window shutters and replacement of the sail frames with wood laminate.

In 2010 Sedgemoor Council decided it could no longer afford to maintain the windmill and has appealed for an independent group of trustees to take on the responsibility for the building.

References

External links
Ashton Windmill at Sedgemoor District Council
Ashton Windmill feature, which won CBA Young Archaeologist of the Year Award in 2006 for its author.

Museums in Somerset
Mill museums in England
Windmills in Somerset
Grade II* listed buildings in Sedgemoor
Tower mills in the United Kingdom
Grinding mills in the United Kingdom
Grade II* listed windmills